Stephen P. Bell is an American biochemist.

Bell earned a doctorate from the University of California, Berkeley, and teaches at the Massachusetts Institute of Technology, where he specializes in researching DNA replication and replisomes. He was named a Howard Hughes Medical Investigator in 2000. In 2009, Bell received the NAS Award in Molecular Biology and was named a member of the National Academy of Sciences itself in 2017. MIT appointed Bell the Uncas and Helen Whitaker Professor of Biology in 2018.
He is a member of the Editorial Board for Genes & Development.

References

Living people
Year of birth missing (living people)
American biochemists
University of California, Berkeley alumni
Massachusetts Institute of Technology School of Science faculty
Members of the United States National Academy of Sciences
Howard Hughes Medical Investigators